The 1992 South Australian Soccer Federation season was the 86th season of soccer in South Australia.

1992 SASF Division One

The 1992 South Australian Division One season was the top level domestic association football competition in South Australia for 1992. It was contested by 10 teams in a 18 round league format, each team playing all of their opponents twice.

League table

Finals

1992 SASF Division Two

The 1992 South Australian Division Two season was the second level domestic association football competition in South Australia for 1992. It was contested by 10 teams in a 18 round league format, each team playing all of their opponents twice.

League table

Finals

References

1992 in Australian soccer
Football South Australia seasons